The Qitian Mountains, also known as Guiyang Mountains are a series of mountains located in Chenzhou, Hunan Province, the smallest one of the Five Ranges in the Nanling Mountains. The Qitan Mountains runs through Beihu District and Yizhang County in the southwestern Chenzhou.

References

Ranges of the Nanling Mountains
Geography of Chenzhou